Pavlos Papaioannou (born 19 March 1959) is a Greek-Brazilian former professional footballer.

Club career
Papaioannou started his football career at Rodos with which he made great appearances, attracting the interest of the big clubs. On July 9, 1983, he was transferred to AEK Athens for 10 million drachmas plus the incomes from a friendly match between the two club in Rhodes. Papaioannou was a key member of AEK for most of his long spell at the club. He played mainly as a defensive midfielder, but also as a right back. He stood out for his good physical condition, his continuous running and his contribution mainly in the blocking part, while also participating in the offensive. The most important moment in his career was his goal against Real Madrid in the 1–0 win for the UEFA Cup that took place at 18 September 1985. His best period in the team was his last two years, when he was paired with Refik Šabanadžović in the midfield and was liberated increasing his performance. At AEK he won 3 Championships, 1 Super Cup and 1 League Cup, while he also was their captain in several occasions. He left AEK in the summer of 1993 when the management decided to proceed in a small renewal of the roster and moved to Kalamata for a season before ending his career. After the end of his playing career, Papaioannou enacted with coaching.

International career
Papaioannou was eligible to play for Greece through his father and Brazil through his mother and place of birth. He was eventually capped 10 times by the Greece. When he made his debut, he officially became the first Greek with a mixture of Brazilian descent to play for the Greece.

Personal life
Papaioannou was born in Brazil, the son of a Greek father and a Brazilian mother. His daughter, Ramona is a 60m. sprinter, competing for AEK Athens. She is a Cyprus international.

Honours

AEK Athens 
Alpha Ethniki: 1988–89, 1991–92, 1992–93
Greek Super Cup: 1989
Greek League Cup: 1990

References

External links

Pavlos Papaioannou at phantis.com

1959 births
Living people
Greek footballers
Brazilian footballers
Greece international footballers
Super League Greece players
Rodos F.C. players
AEK Athens F.C. players
Kalamata F.C. players
Brazilian expatriate sportspeople in Greece
Brazilian people of Greek descent
Greek people of Brazilian descent
Association football defenders
Footballers from São Paulo